Copiapó is a city and commune in northern Chile, located about 65 kilometers east of the coastal town of Caldera. Founded on December 8, 1744, it is the capital of Copiapó Province and Atacama Region.

Copiapó lies about 800 km north of Santiago by the Copiapó River, in the valley of the same name. In the early 21st century, the river has dried up in response to climate change and more severe droughts. The town is surrounded by the Atacama Desert and receives 12 mm (½ in) of rain per year. The population of Copiapó was 9,128 in 1903; and 11,617 in 1907. As of 2012, there are 158,438 inhabitants.

Copiapó is in a rich silver and copper mining district. A bronze statue commemorates Juan Godoy, discoverer of the Chañarcillo silver mines in the 19th century. The Copiapó-Caldera railway line, built in 1850, was the first one in South America. The first section between Caldera and Monte Amargo was inaugurated on July 4, 1850 in honor of the Independence Day, as American businessman William Wheelwright was responsible for the project.  The original wooden railway station is now a National Monument.

History

Spanish explorers founded the settlement in 1742 and named it San Francisco de la Selva de Copiapó or Saint Francis of the Jungle of Copiapó, due to its lush vegetation. Prior to Spanish occupation, the area was inhabited by the Diaguita people under the rule of the Inca Empire into the 16th century. Remains of Diaguita fortresses have been found in this area. The earliest archaeological remains of human activity in the Copiapó Valley have been dated at ten thousand years BP (before present). The settlement developed around the remains of an Inca cemetery.

After the discovery of the rich silver deposits near Chañarcillo by Juan Godoy in 1832 it became an important mining centre, and until Chile annexed Antofagasta from Bolivia and Iquique and Arica from Peru following the War of the Pacific (1879–1883), Copiapó was the nation's northernmost city and main mining city.

An earthquake on 4 December 1918 caused extensive damage throughout the city.

Through the 20th century, the city of Copiapó has grown markedly, both from the mining industry and its role as capital of its department.

On 5 August 2010, the San José Copper Mine collapsed, trapping 33 miners underground. Private, local, national and international resources cooperated in their rescue. The miners survived underground for 69 days until all were brought to the surface on 13 October 2010, a record period of time. This mine has been closed, but the industry of copper and gold mining is very important in the region.

Demographics
According to the 2002 census of the National Statistics Institute, Copiapó had 129,091 inhabitants (64,922 men and 64,169 women). Of these, 125,983 (97.6%) lived in urban areas and 3,108 (2.4%) in rural areas. The population grew by 27.9% (28,184 persons) between the 1992 and 2002 censuses.

According to the same census, the religious affiliation in Copiapó, is the following:
 75.97% Roman Catholic
 10.74% Protestant
 1.29% The Church of Jesus Christ of Latter-day Saints
 1.25% Jehovah's Witnesses
 0.04% Judaism
 0.03% Islam
 0.02% Greek Orthodox 
 3.56% Other
 7.10% None, atheism or agnosticism.

Climate 
Copiapó  has a desert climate (Köppen: BWh) with mild temperatures year round. The cold Humboldt Current offshore leads to cool summer temperatures for being inland on its low latitude, and contributes to the very low annual rainfall. Temperatures rarely fall below freezing. Most of the precipitation falls during this time of the year with June and July being the wettest months. While winters are normally dry, precipitation is highly variable. This was the case when June 1998 recorded  of precipitation but generally, in most years, precipitation is rare. Temperatures can occasionally exceed  any time of the year. There are 3.2 days with measurable precipitation.

Economy
Copiapó has a diversified and potential economy, but mining is the largest economic activity. The Copiapó Basin has a great deal of copper ore, mined by companies such as Minera Candelaria, which extracts copper near Tierra Amarilla, a neighboring commune. This generates a need for transportation, light industry, and services. "Small mining" represents over 30% of the production. The copper obtained by pirquineros (miners) goes to the copper smelter at Paipote.

Agriculture is the second-largest source of income in this area. It consists largely of grape production, with olives, tomatoes, avocados and some citrus fruits also produced as commodity crops.

Industry: Copiapó has mainly light industry, and some medium industry such as the INACESA plant and Paipote copper refinery.

Energy: Many important solar plants were built in the Atacama Region, benefiting from the high amount of and constant solar radiation during the year. Solar photovoltaic energy production in 2016 reached more than 400 MW connected to the Central-North grid.

Commerce is growing in Copiapó, largely old and new, small and medium enterprises. Downtown Copiapó activity reflects the growth of the city. Some local enterprises have grown rapidly in the last decade, such as the Albasini and Don Álvaro chain-stores. The national government's free-market policies, along with a higher demand and better economic expectations, have encouraged the establishment here of such national businesses as the supermarkets Deca (1999), Jumbo (2005), and Lider (2006).

Tourism in Copiapó has been developing since the early 21st century. Some come to see the desert and indigenous monuments, such as the Inca cemetery in the city, which was investigated in the 1930s. In addition, a new casino has attracted both domestic and foreign tourists, and hotels have invested in new amenities and structures to satisfy demand.

Attractions

Copiapó steam locomotive, year 1850. University of Atacama,
Mineralogic Museum, 
Plaza de Armas, 
Regional Museum of the Matta Family, 
Wooden Railway Station, 
the San José Copper Mine (closed in 2010); 
Totoralillo, Totoral and the zone of "Travesía" on the coast, wherein after rain, the "Desierto Florido" appears; 
In the Andes, the Ojos del Salado volcano, and the lakes Green and Negro Francisco, 
Tres Cruces National Park in the Andes.

Administration

Municipal government
 As a commune, Copiapó is a third-level administrative division of Chile administered by a municipal council, headed by an alcalde who is directly elected every four years. The 2012-2016 alcalde is Maglio Cicardini (Independent). The council has the following members:
 Magaly Milla Montaño (Independent)
 Luis Orrego Salinas (Independent)
 Rosa Ahumada Campusano (PC)
 José Bernardino Fernández Quevedo (PPD)
 Omar Luz Hidalgo (Independent)
 Anelice Véliz Kratzschmar (PS)
 Mario Enrique Bordoli Vergara (RN)
 Juan Carlos Mellibovsky Leiva (RN)

Recent municipal politics 
Since the return to democracy in 1990, there have been six mayoral elections held in Copiapó.
 
In 1992, Mónica Calcutta (PPD) won the election against 24 candidates. Her term was characterized by public expenditures on green areas, parks, and street paving, and public infrastructure such as the new building of the City Hall (1994), the Estadio Techado (1996), and the Technological School (inaugurated in 1997). During her term, Calcutta encouraged people to participate. One of these activities was the "Train of History" carried out in 1994 (for the 250th anniversary of Copiapó) and 1995.

Despite all these expenditures, the City Hall ended up with no debt for 1996.

In 1996, Calcutta ran for the re-election, but was defeated by the socialist candidate Marcos López (city councilor 1992–1996) by a narrow margin of 146 votes. López's term differed substantially from Calcutta's; his first three years as mayor did not see any important public expenditures in visible things. They came out the year before the following election.

The 2000 election was a very confrontational one. López and Calcutta ran for election together with 10 other candidates. In spite of surveys that showed a virtual tie between them, López won the election with an overwhelming 50.07% of the votes to his rival's 31.52%.

López's second term in office was characterized by high public expenditures, part of it from the Central Government to improve Chilean infrastructure toward the bicentennial of Independence. These expenditures went towards redesigning the Central Square, Matta Avenue and the City Chamber.

In 2004, Marcos López was elected to another term, defeating the rightist candidate René Aedo (RN) with 50.01% to 40.82% of the votes.

In 2008, López run for a fourth term, but was defeated by the independent candidate Maglio Cicardini Neyra, by a margin of less than 1% of the votes.

In 2012, López run once again, but lost against Cicardini, who won the election with more than 50% of the votes.

In 2016, Cicardini lost against Marcos López.

Congressional representation
Within the electoral divisions of Chile, Copiapó is represented in the Chamber of Deputies by Lautaro Carmona (PC) and Daniella Cicardini Milla (Independent, backed up by the PS) as part of the 5th electoral district, (together with Chañaral and Diego de Almagro). The commune is represented in the Senate by Isabel Allende Bussi (PS) and Baldo Prokurica Prokurica (RN) as part of the 3rd senatorial constituency (Atacama Region).

Education
Copiapó provides public and private education, from kindergarten to high school, and also technical and bachelor's degrees.

Schools 
According to the Departament of Education of Chile, Copiapó had (2007) an enrollment of more than 35.000 students, divided in the following programs: Kindergarten, 3.780 students; Differencial Education, 1.009 students; Elementary and Middle School, 20.794 students; High School, 10.291 students (5.185 in Scientific-Humanist programs and 5.106 in Technical-Professional programs).

La commune of Copiapó offers public and private education held by 64 schools, divided in: 61 urbans and 3 rurals; 32 public, 23 State-subsidized private schools and 9 private schools.

Universities 
 Universidad de Atacama was founded in 1857, and is the only public university in the Third Region.
 Universidad Santo Tomás (Copiapó)
 Universidad Tecnológica de Chile, INACAP (Copiapó)

Professional institutes 
 Instituto Tecnológico UDA (public)
 Santo Tomás (private)
 Inacap (private)
 Iplacex (private)

Technical centers of study 
 CFT Benjamín Teplizky (private)
 CFT Santo Tomás (private)
 CFT Inacap (private)
 CFT Cepa (private)

Sports and recreation

Football 
This city has a football team called Club de Deportes Copiapó, which was born after the dissolution of Regional Atacama, in 1999. It plays in the Primera A League of football of Chile, and plays as local in the Luis Valenzuela Hermosilla Stadium and in the Municipal Stadium of Tierra Amarilla.

Raid Atacama 
This is the event that gathers the most 4x4 automobiles in the world, and it began in 1992.

The effort and spirit of Raid Atacama has made it worthy of the National Award for Tourism. For over 21 years, the Atacama Raid has been the cornerstone of the development of off-road activities along Chile, and its example has been followed by many clubs and even several companies.

In the last seven years, the enrollment has kept steady on an average of about 500 vehicles per event, and more than 1,800 participants from all regions of the country and abroad.

In 1997, it reached the largest number of participants to date, bringing together 613 4x4 vehicles. With no other event as large, this made it possible to apply for registration as a world record. Another of the achievements is to hold, without competition, the record for international off-road event (amateur) with greater permanence in time.

Rally Dakar 
In the last years, Copiapó has been not only one of the Chilean communes the Rally Dakar Chile-Argentina has passed through, but also the place of birth of Jaime Prohens, considered by some as one of the most important participants of this rally.

Transportation 
Copiapo is served by Desierto de Atacama Airport, with commercial passenger airline service on three of Chile's major airlines.

As mentioned above, there is also an important railway in the city.

Sister cities 

 Catamarca, Argentina
 Córdoba, Argentina
 Felipe Varela, Argentina
 La Rioja, Argentina
 Santiago del Estero, Argentina
 Jiujiang, China
 Nanchang, China
 Panyu, China
 Pingxiang, China
 Ruichang, China
 Castellón de la Plana, Spain

References

External links
 
 Municipality of Copiapó 

Communes of Chile
Atacama Desert
Capitals of Chilean regions
Capitals of Chilean provinces
Populated places in Copiapó Province
Populated places in Atacama Region
Populated places established in 1744
1744 establishments in the Spanish Empire